Japanese curry is commonly served in three main forms: , curry udon (curry over thick noodles), and  (a curry-filled pastry). It is one of the most popular dishes in Japan.

Along with the sauce, a wide variety of vegetables and meats are used to make Japanese curry. The basic vegetables are onions, carrots, and potatoes. Beef, pork, and chicken are the most popular meat choices. Katsu curry is a breaded deep-fried cutlet (tonkatsu; usually pork or chicken) with Japanese curry sauce.

In the UK, katsu curry is sometimes applied to any type of Japanese curry.

Overview
Curry originates in Indian cuisine and was brought to Japan from India by the British. The Imperial Japanese Navy adopted curry to prevent beriberi, and now the Japan Maritime Self-Defense Force's Friday menu is curry. It is also nutritious, and easy to cook in mass quantity. The dish became popular and available for purchase at supermarkets and restaurants in the late 1960s. Since the introduction of curry, it was reinvented to suit Japanese tastes and ingredients. Japanese curry has little resemblance to curried dishes from other regions. It was changed and adapted so much that it stands on its own as uniquely Japanese. It is so widely consumed that it can be called a national dish.

History

Curry was introduced to Japan during the Meiji era (1868–1912). At the time the Indian subcontinent was under British colonial rule. Anglo-Indian officers of the Royal Navy brought the spice mix called curry powder to Japan. It was classified as yōshoku (Western food) since it came from the West. By the 1870s, curry began to be served in Japan, and became a staple within the Japanese diet.

Curry is commonly eaten as a rice dish in Japan,  (curry rice). The oldest Japanese mention of a dish called  (literally 'rice curry')—but as the misspelt —is in cookbooks from 1872. It was also described in an 1872 report, according to which foreign experts ate this at the Tokyo branch of the Hokkaidō prefectural government. However, the word was popularized by American professor William S. Clark who was employed at the Sapporo Agricultural College (now University of Hokkaido) in 1877. For 1873, there was a dish called curry rice on the menu of the Imperial Japanese Army Military Academy. Since its introduction it was reinvented with ingredients from Japanese cuisine to make it suitable for Japanese tastes.

It was not until the early twentieth century, when curry was adopted by the Japanese Navy and Army, that the dish began to become popular with the Japanese. After its favorable reception within the Japanese Army and Navy, it later became common in school cafeterias. By 2000, curry was a more frequent meal than sushi or tempura. The fame of the dish in Japan is mainly due to the Imperial Japanese Navy, which was modeled after the Royal Navy, whose sailors ate a meat stew with curry seasoning and bread as a side dish for their voyages, which was also provided by the Japanese Navy. The Maritime Self-Defense Force took over this tradition after the war and serves it every Friday with a salad, with each ship having its own variant.

In the civil sector, curry was particularly popular at the beginning of the Meiji period (1868–1912), as it first had to be imported, and was still an exclusive dish that could only be eaten in expensive restaurants specializing in Western cuisine. In the Taishō period (1912–1926), the dish became affordable for the general population, especially towards the end, with the introduction of domestically produced curry mixes.

Today, curry is one of the most popular daily dishes in Japan. In 2013, production totaled 7,570 tons of curry powder and 91,105 tons of ready-made sauces; sales in 2008 amounted to 7 billion yen for curry powder and 86 billion yen for ready-made sauces.

Curry similar to that served in the Indian subcontinent is known as Nakamura-ya curry.

Sauce mixes
 is served on top of cooked rice to make curry rice. Curry sauce is made by frying together curry powder, flour, and oil, along with other ingredients, to make roux; the roux is then added to stewed meat and vegetables, and then simmered until thickened. Pressure cooking can be used as well. Adding potatoes to curry sauce was introduced by William S. Clark due to rice shortages at the time.

In Japanese homes, curry sauce is most commonly made from instant curry roux, which is available in block and powder forms. These contain curry powder, flour, oils, and various flavorings. Ease of preparation, variety, and availability of instant curry mixes made curry rice very popular, as it is very easy to make compared to many other Japanese dishes. Pre-made curry is available in retort pouches that can be reheated in boiling water. For those who make curry roux from scratch, there are also curry powders specially formulated to create the "Japanese curry" taste.

Instant curry roux was first sold in powder form by House Foods in 1926, and in block form by S&B Foods in 1956. In 2007, Japanese domestic shipments of instant curry roux was 82.7 billion yen. Market share for household use in 2007 was captured almost entirely by House Foods (59.0%), S&B Foods (25.8%) and Ezaki Glico (9.4%). Curry is marketed to children utilizing characters from video games and anime.

Retort pouch curry sauce, prepared by heating the retort pouch in hot water or the microwave, is also popular. As of 2007, curry sauce is the largest single category of vacuum-sealed foods in Japan, making up over 30% of sales.

Serving
Japanese curry rice is served in anything from a flat plate to a soup bowl. The curry is poured over rice in any manner and amount. Japanese short-grain rice, which is sticky and round, is preferred, rather than the medium-grain variety used in Indian dishes. It is usually eaten with a spoon, as opposed to chopsticks, because of the liquid nature of the curry. Curry rice is usually served with fukujinzuke or rakkyō on the side.

Other varieties

: Curry rice served with a breaded pork cutlet on top.
: Curry-flavored fried rice, or curry rice with a drier, mince meat curry sauce.
: Curry rice, served with the sauce and rice already mixed. Popularized by the  curry restaurants in Osaka.
: Curry sauce, thickened and flavored with mentsuyu or hondashi and served on top of a bowl of rice, to give the curry a Japanese flavor.
: Rice served with curry sauce and hayashi sauce (fried beef and onion, cooked with red wine and demi-glace).
: Curry rice, topped with a raw egg and baked in an oven. Originally from Kitakyushu.
: Curry sauce with rice served in a heated stone bowl, in a similar way to dolsot bibimbap.
: Soup curry, a watery, broth-like curry sauce served with chunky ingredients such as a chicken leg and coarsely-cut vegetables. Popular in Hokkaido.

Local curries
In the late 1990s, a number of regional specialty curries emerged, popularised as vacuum-sealed curry sauces. These include:
 from Hokkaido.
 from Aomori Prefecture.
 from Chiba Prefecture.
 from Nagano Prefecture and Aomori Prefecture.
 from Mito, Ibaraki.
 from Aichi Prefecture.
 from Mie Prefecture.
 from Wakayama Prefecture.
 from Hiroshima Prefecture.
 from Shimane Prefecture.
 from Kagoshima Prefecture.
 from Okinawa.

Local curries are also marketed to help boost tourism.

Outside Japan

South Korea
Curry was introduced to South Korea during the period of Japanese rule, and is popular there. It is often found at bunsik restaurants (diner-style establishments), donkkaseu-oriented restaurants, and at the majority of Japanese restaurants. Premade curry and powdered mixes are also readily available at supermarkets.

North Korea 
Japanese-style curry was introduced to North Korea by Koreans and Japanese who were abducted from Japan to North Korea during the 1960s–1970s repatriation project. Along with other Japanese cuisine, it was traded by new arrivals for local products and used to bribe Workers' Party cadres.

Elsewhere
Mixes can be found outside Japan and Korea in supermarkets that have a Japanese section or in Japanese or Asian food stores. Mixes are also available from retailers online.

The largest Japanese curry company in Japan is House Foods Corporation. The company operated more than 10 Curry House restaurants in the US until mid-2019 when it sold off its interest to CH Acquisitions LLC, which abruptly closed the restaurants in February 2020. House Foods associated company CoCo Ichibanya (Ichibanya Co., Ltd.) or Kokoichi has more than 1,200 restaurants in Japan. CoCo Ichibanya has branches in China, Hong Kong, Taiwan, Korea, Singapore, Indonesia, Philippines, Thailand, United Kingdom, Hawaii, California, and India.

Japanese curry and curry sauce are sometimes referred to inaccurately as "katsu curry" in the UK, even in cases where the katsu (cutlet) itself is not included.

See also
 Rice and curry
 Gyūdon

References

Further reading
 
 
 

East Asian curries
Curry
Japanese rice dishes
National dishes